Yousef M. Alhorr  (born January 10, 1967) is a Qatari environmentalist known for his work in the field of sustainable built environment and climate actions. He is founder and chairman of the Gulf Organisation for Research and Development (GORD) and adviser for sustainable delivery and legacy of 2022 FIFA World Cup. He is the founding chairman of Global Carbon Council, which is one of the eight international programs approved by ICAO’s CORSIA and ICROA to supply carbon credits to international airlines to meet their carbon neutral growth. Alhorr is also the founding chairman of Global Accreditation Bureau – an accreditation body which is Associate Member of Asia Pacific Accreditation Cooperation (APAC), and an Accreditation Body Member of International Accreditation Forum (IAF). He is the president of Green Building Committee at the GCC Standardization Organization (GSO).  

Alhorr led the research and development of innovative energy-efficient solutions, including Synergia7n1 – a hybrid ultra-efficient patented, smart cooling technology for fresh air, that earned him the award for AEE’s Energy Innovator of the Year 2022. He helped draft the first version of Section 7 entitled Green Construction of Qatar Constructions Specifications (QCS). The 1800-page document launched in 2010 has been replaced with 2014 edition that is being used as a guide setting forth the building codes to be followed by the industry. Alhorr is also a member of the board of trustees for the University of Doha for Science and Technology (2017-2022) and advisory board member of the College of Engineering at Qatar University His name comes in the list of the Qatar University’s most notable alumni. He has worked as a sustainability consultant for a variety of projects in the MENA region, providing strategic guidance on sustainable development for projects including all the stadiums currently being prepared to host the 2022 World Cup.

Academic background 
Alhorr received his Bachelor of Science degree in Mechanical Engineering from Qatar University’s College of Engineering in 1989,  followed by Master of Science in Materials Engineering from the George Washington University, USA, in 1996. In 2000, he earned a doctorate degree in Materials Engineering from the University of Manchester Institute of Science and Technology, UK.

Professional background 
From 2000 to 2004, Alhorr was the assistant professor at Qatar University’s College of Engineering. In September 2004 until 2006, he joined the institute’s active research wing, taking up the position of Assistant Vice President for Research. From then onward up until 2011, he held several positions at Qatar’s leading Barwa Real Estate Company as a deputy CEO, strategic adviser and president for strategy and investment, and CEO and chairman of Barwa Knowledge.

In 2009, Alhorr set the foundation of the Gulf Organisation for Research and Development (GORD) and directed the development of the Middle East’s first regionally incorporated sustainability system called Qatar Sustainability Assessment System (QSAS). QSAS was later re-branded as the Global Sustainability Assessment System (GSAS) and has since been used in Qatar and the Middle East as one of the chief sustainability systems alongside LEED. As the Chairman of GORD, Alhorr supervises the authorization of green certification for construction projects in Qatar and the MENA region.

Alhorr was the recipient of the Emerging CEO – Green Buildings prize from the Federation of GCC Chambers as well as the Environment & Sustainability Award.

Speaking engagements 
Alhorr has lectured several seminars during and after his time as a faculty member and director of research at his alma meter, Qatar University. He has chaired several conferences and has been regularly invited as a keynote and guest speaker at regional and global industry events including the 2012 United Nations Climate Change Conference (COP18), 2021 United Nations Climate Change Conference (COP26), International Real Estate Finance Summit (IREF) 2009, World Stadium Congress 2013, 18th Gulf Engineering Forum 2015, Kuwait Green Building Forum 2012, Qatar Sustainable Building Forum 2012 and 7th Annual Façade Design and Engineering Middle East.

References

Living people
1967 births
Qatari businesspeople
Academic staff of Qatar University
Environmentalism in Asia
Qatari engineers
Qatar University alumni
George Washington University School of Engineering and Applied Science alumni
Alumni of the University of Manchester